Bomis is a genus of crab spiders that was first described by Ludwig Carl Christian Koch in 1874.

Species
 it contains five species, found in India, Western Australia, New South Wales, Queensland, and South Australia:
Bomis bengalensis Tikader, 1962 – India
Bomis calcuttaensis Biswas & Mazumder, 1981 – India
Bomis hippoponoi Szymkowiak, 2017 – Australia (South Australia, Queensland, New South Wales)
Bomis khajuriai Tikader, 1980 – India
Bomis larvata L. Koch, 1874 (type) – Australia (Western Australia, Queensland, New South Wales)

See also
 List of Thomisidae species

References

Further reading

External links

Araneomorphae genera
Taxa named by Carl Ludwig Koch
Thomisidae